Tyndall Glacier or Geike Glacier is one of the largest glaciers in the Southern Patagonian Ice Field. It is located in the Torres del Paine National Park, Chile. The glacier has its main calving front in Geikie Lake and like its neighbor, Grey Glacier, it has been significantly retreating for the last years. The glacier is named after the Irish glaciologist John Tyndall.

References

 Tyndall Glacier at the NASA Earth Observatory

Glaciers of Magallanes Region
Torres del Paine National Park